Samba '68 is a 1968 album by Marcos Valle, arranged by Eumir Deodato.

Reception

Billboard magazine reviewed the album in their March 23, 1968 issue and wrote that the album was a "topnotch album of [Valle's] contemporary samba music".

John Bush reviewed the reissue of the album for Allmusic and wrote that the album was "a vibrant set of Brazilian pop, indebted to bossa nova and samba but undeniably Americanized for a domestic audience. The result is a joyous album throughout that wears its dated sound quite well". Bush also described the vocal harmonies of Anamaria Valle as providing a "beautiful counterpoint" to Valle's voice and concluded that the album was "one of the best Brazilian crossovers of the 1960s".

Track listing 
 "The Answer" (Ray Gilbert, Marcos Valle, Paulo Sérgio Valle) – 2:45 
 "Crickets Sing for Anamaria" (Gilbert, M. Valle, P. S. Valle) – 2:09 
 "So Nice (Summer Samba)" (Norman Gimbel, M. Valle) – 2:30 
 "Chup, Chup, I Got Away" (Gilbert, M. Valle, P. S. Valle) – 2:18 
 "If You Went Away" (Gilbert, M. Valle) – 2:55 
 "Pepino Beach" (Gilbert, M. Valle) – 1:53 
 "She Told Me, She Told Me" (Gilbert, M. Valle, P. S. Valle) – 2:44 
 "It's Time to Sing" (Gilbert, M. Valle, P. S. Valle) – 2:54
 "Batucada" (Gilbert, M. Valle, P. S. Valle) – 2:05
 "The Face I Love" (Gilbert, Carlos Pingarilho, M. Valle, P. S. Valle) – 1:58 
 "Safely in Your Arms" (Gilbert, Pingarilho, M. Valle) – 3:09

Personnel 
Marcos Valle – guitar, vocals
Anamaria Valle – vocals
Deodato – arranger
Claudio Slon – drums
Ray Gilbert – producer
Production
Acy Lehman – cover design, design
Suzanne White – design coordinator
Sung Lee – design
Deborah Hay – editing
Frank Laico – engineer
Val Valentin – engineering director
Richard Seidel – executive producer
Sidney Eden, Merv Griffin – liner notes
Kevin Reeves – mastering, mixing
Bob Morgan – producer
Tom Greenwood, Carlos Kase – production assistant
Terri Tierney – production coordination
Bryan Koniarz, Jerry Rappaport – reissue coordination
Ben Young – research, restoration

References

1968 albums
Albums arranged by Eumir Deodato
Marcos Valle albums
Verve Records albums